Anoplognathini is a tribe of scarab beetles belonging to the subfamily Rutelinae, a group endemic to the Neotropical and Australian biogeographic realms.

Subtribes
 Anoplognathina MacLeay, 1819
 Schizognathina Ohaus, 1918
 Phalangogoniina Ohaus, 1918
 Platycoeliina Burmeister, 1844
 Brachysternina Burmeister, 1844

References

.
Beetle tribes